Snap federal elections were held in Germany on 7 December 1924, the second that year after the Reichstag had been dissolved on 20 October. The Social Democratic Party remained the largest party in the Reichstag, receiving an increased share of the vote and winning 131 of the 493 seats. Voter turnout was 78.8%.

Results

References

Germany
1924 elections in Germany
1924 05
1924 05
December 1924 events